Lord Vere Bertie (c.1712 – 13 September 1768) was a British politician, a younger son of the Duke of Ancaster and Kesteven who represented Boston, Lincolnshire in Parliament from 1741 to 1754.

Bertie was the third son of Robert Bertie, 1st Duke of Ancaster and Kesteven, and the first son by his second marriage to Albinia Farrington. He was educated at Westminster School from 1724 to 1728, and was commissioned an ensign in the 2nd Regiment of Foot Guards on 19 March 1728/9, retiring in July 1737.

Bertie married Anne Casey, the illegitimate daughter of Sir Cecil Wray, 11th Baronet, on 4 October 1736. They had two sons and two daughters. The sons died young; the two daughters, his heirs, were:
Albinia Bertie (1737/8–1816), married George Hobart, 3rd Earl of Buckinghamshire
Louisa Bertie, married Sir Charles Stuart

In the 1741 election, Bertie was returned as Member of Parliament for Boston on his family's interest. He voted with the Carteret ministry to support the Hanoverian army in 1742, but defected from them on the same question in January 1744. He did not vote in the 1746 division on the Hanoverian subsidies, but after the 1747 election, when he was returned again after a contest, was considered to have gone into opposition to the Pelham ministry.

Bertie stood down from Parliament in 1754 and died on 13 September 1768.

References

1710s births
1768 deaths
Coldstream Guards officers
Younger sons of dukes
British MPs 1741–1747
British MPs 1747–1754
Members of the Parliament of Great Britain for English constituencies
Vere
People educated at Westminster School, London